Antilia is a private residence in the billionaires row of Mumbai, India, named after the mythical island Antillia.
It is the residence of the Indian billionaire Mukesh Ambani and his family, who moved into it in 2012.

The architectural design of Antilia has been fashioned along the lines of the lotus and the sun. The top six floors of the building have been set aside as the private full-floor residential area. It is also designed to withstand a magnitude 8 earthquake.

, it is considered the world's most expensive private residence, costing between US$1 and 2 billion to build.

Plot 
The  land on which Antilia was built housed an orphanage called Currimbhoy Ebrahim Khoja Yateemkhana belonging to a charity run by the Wakf board. The orphanage had been founded in 1895 by Currimbhoy Ebrahim, a wealthy shipowner.
In 2002, the trust requested permission to sell this land, and the charity commissioner gave the required permission three months later.
The prevailing market value of the land at the time was at least .

The sale was in direct contravention of § 51 of the Wakf Act which requires that any such sale of land should be done after the permission of the Maharashtra State Board of Waqfs. The Waqf minister Nawab Malik opposed this land sale, as did the revenue department of the Government of Maharashtra. Thus a stay order was issued on the sale of the land. The Waqf board also initially opposed the deal and filed a PIL in the Supreme Court challenging the decision of the trust. The Supreme Court, while dismissing the petition, asked the Waqf board to approach the Bombay High Court. However, the stay on the deal was subsequently vacated after the Waqf board withdrew its objection.

In June 2011, the Union government asked the Maharashtra government to consider referring the matter to the Central Bureau of Investigation.
A PIL was filed a decade later by Abdul Matin, against the orphanage and the Charity commissioners permission. As of 2018, the case was being heard by a special bench of the court.

Design and construction

The building was designed by two US architecture firms Perkins & Will, based in Chicago, and Hirsch Bedner Associates, based in Los Angeles. They were consulted after Nita Dalal Ambani was impressed by the contemporary Asian interiors at the Mandarin Oriental, New York, also designed by them.

The building plan was approved by the Brihanmumbai Municipal Corporation in 2003, and construction started in 2006 with Leighton Asia initially taking charge, and completed by B. E. Billimoria & Company Ltd. The architects altered floor plans and design concepts as the construction of the building progressed. The home has 27 floors with extra-high ceilings. (Other buildings of equivalent height may have as many as 60 floors.) The home was also designed to survive an earthquake of magnitude 8. It is considered by some to be the tallest single-family house in the world, but others disqualify the Antilia because it includes space for a staff of 600.

The interior design uses the shapes of the lotus and the sun. These two features are repeated throughout the building using crystals, marble, and mother-of-pearl. However, no two floors use the same materials or plan, the idea of the design is of consistency, but no repetition.

The building has one helipad, however, it is not operational. The helipads have to be certified air-worthy by the Director-General of Civil Aviation (DGCA), and have yet to get approval from the central defence and environment ministries.

The house warming was done in November 2010, but Ambani did not immediately move in for fear of "bad luck". In June 2011, almost 50 renowned pandits were invited to conduct pujas and address vastu issues in the building, after which the Ambanis took up residence in September 2011.

Cost and valuation 
Prior to construction, the worth of the plot and unbuilt house were estimated to be more than US$1.2 billion. During planning, the house was expected to be the world's largest and most expensive home, with a cost of about US$2 billion.

, it is considered the world's most expensive private residence.

Incidents
On 10 July 2017, a fire broke out on the ninth floor, and it was extinguished within a few minutes. Six fire tenders reached the building within 10 minutes of getting the call. However, the fire was extinguished by Antilia staff before the fire brigade team arrived, using a small line of fixed firefighting systems and fire extinguishers. The fire was confined to the 4G antenna and plastic framing of the vertical garden.

On February 25, 2021, a car containing 20 explosive gelatin sticks and a threatening letter targeting the Ambanis, was found near Antilia. The car was parked about 400 metres from the building on Carmichael Road bordering Altamount Road. A security officer at Antilia placed a call to the police control room regarding the suspicious vehicle, and the police rushed to the spot, joined by the bomb detection and disposal squad. After the sniffer dogs detected explosives, the bomb squad removed the gelatin sticks, which were found to be not assembled, and had no battery or detonator. The probe was led by the Mumbai's crime intelligence unit head Sachin Vaze. The case was handed to the National Investigative Agency, which found out that Vaze was himself involved in this incident, and he was arrested.

Public reception 
Tata Group former chairman Ratan Tata said Antilia is an example of rich Indians' lack of empathy for the poor. Tata said, "The person who lives in there should be concerned about what he sees around him and asking how he can make a difference. If he cannot, then it's sad because this country needs people to allocate some of their enormous wealth to finding ways of mitigating the hardship that people have. It makes me wonder why someone would do that. That's what revolutions are made of."

See also
 List of tallest buildings in Mumbai

References

Notes

Citations

External links

Most Expensive Home in the World has 27 Floors and Slum Views – slideshow by the Los Angeles Times
Antilia is the world’s most expensive house for $1 billion – Luxurylaunches
It's sad Mukesh Ambani lives in such opulence: Ratan Tata
Mukesh Ambani's residence Antilia

Houses completed in 2010
Residential skyscrapers in Mumbai
Postmodern architecture in India
Towers completed in 2010
2010 establishments in Maharashtra